The Asian Football Confederation (AFC) section of the 2014 FIFA World Cup qualification saw 43 teams competing for 4 or 5 berths in the final tournament in Brazil. As in recent tournaments the AFC had four direct qualifiers for the finals tournament in addition to a further possible place via the intercontinental play-offs against CONMEBOL's fifth-placed team, which was chosen through a random draw, rather than being decided by FIFA beforehand as in previous tournaments (e.g., 2010 against a team from OFC, 2006 against a team from CONCACAF). Iran and South Korea from Group A, along with Australia and Japan from Group B won the 4 direct qualification positions, with Jordan defeating Uzbekistan in a play-off to see which team would face the 5th placed CONMEBOL team, Uruguay, for a place in the World Cup, eventually also failed to qualify for the competition.

Format
The main qualifying draw took place in Brazil on 30 July 2011. Initially it was announced that the AFC Competitions Committee decided to use the 2010 qualification format for the 2014 FIFA World Cup in Brazil. The AFC published information in their calendar suggesting qualifiers would start on 8 October 2010 with the first leg of first round ties.

Therefore, for the 2010 finals, FIFA advised the AFC that 2014 qualifiers could not begin until after mid-2011. On 13 August 2010 the AFC announced a format for the qualifiers that was identical to the 2010 format even though the final number of qualifiers had not been determined. A final format, with the initial stages modified slightly from 2010, was announced in March 2011.

Qualification began with two sets of two-leg knock-out qualification rounds – the first held on 29 June and 2 July and 3 July 2011 and the second on 23 and 28 July – reducing the number of teams in the main draw to 20.  As in the 2010 format, the third stage consisted of 5 groups of 4 teams (with matches held between September 2011 and February 2012) with the top 2 in each group advancing to 2 groups of 5 that will play a further group stage during 2012 and 2013. The top two teams in each group qualify for the 2014 finals directly, with the two third-placed teams playing-off for a chance to qualify via an intercontinental qualifying tie. A random draw determined that the final tie would be against the fifth-placed team from CONMEBOL qualification.

Entrants
43 of the 46 AFC national teams entered qualification. A ranking list for the qualification rounds was released by AFC on 8 March 2011, with an updated list released due to the non-participation of Guam and Bhutan.

The rankings determined the round of qualification that teams began competition:
Teams ranked 1–5 (the teams that competed in the 2010 FIFA World Cup finals and the intercontinental play-offs) do not compete in the qualification rounds, and automatically qualify for the first group stage (drawn in Brazil in July 2011).
Teams ranked 6–27 (other teams that advanced past the first round in 2010 qualification, plus the three first round losers with the 'best' results) receive a bye to the second round of qualification.
Teams ranked 28–43 enter at the first round.

Notes
Brunei were suspended by FIFA from September 2009 through May 2011. Their reinstatement came too late for Brunei to participate in the 2014 FIFA World Cup.
Bhutan and Guam did not participate in the 2014 FIFA World Cup.

First round

The first round consisted of eight home-and-away series, featuring the 16 lowest ranked teams in Asia. The winners of these series proceeded to the second round.

Seeding
Teams were seeded into two pots – Pot 1 included teams ranked 28–35 and Pot 2 teams ranked 36–43.

Matches
The first round draw of the Asian qualifiers took place on 30 March 2011 in Kuala Lumpur, Malaysia. The first legs were played on 29 June 2011 and the second legs were played on 2 and 3 July 2011.

|}

Second round

The second round consisted of fifteen home-and-away series, featuring the 8 winners from the first round and other 22 teams ranked 6–27. The winners of these series then proceeded to the third round.

Seeding
Teams were seeded into two pots – Pot 1 included teams ranked 6–20 and Pot 2 teams ranked 21–27 along with the 8 first round winners.

† First round winners whose identity was not known at the time of the draw.

Matches
Ties were drawn at the same time as the first round. The first legs were played on 23 July 2011 and the second legs were played on 28 July 2011.

|}

Note 1: The first leg of Oman vs Myanmar was originally won 2–0 by Oman, but was subsequently awarded to them as a 3–0 victory.  The return leg was abandoned in the 45+2 minute due to crowd trouble. Oman was leading 2–0. The result was declared final by FIFA, and Myanmar were initially banned from competing in the qualifying tournament for the 2018 World Cup, although this was lifted after an appeal. So Myanmar had to play their home matches of 2018 World Cup qualifying in neutral ground.
Note 2: Both legs of the Syria vs Tajikistan tie were awarded 3–0 to Tajikistan after Syria was ruled to have fielded an ineligible player. Syria had won the first leg 2–1 and the return leg 4–0.

Third round
 
The third round saw the 5 automatic qualifiers joined by the 15 winners from the second round.  These teams were drawn into five groups of four teams, at the World Cup Preliminary Draw at the Marina da Glória in Rio de Janeiro, Brazil on 30 July 2011. The matches were played from 2 September 2011 to 29 February 2012. The top two teams from each group advanced to the fourth round.

Seeding
The July 2011 FIFA Ranking – released on 27 July – was used to seed the teams. (Rankings shown in brackets)

Note. Syria were replaced by Tajikistan in the third round on 19 August 2011 following the awarding of both second round matches to Tajikistan.

Groups

Group A

Group B

Group C

Group D

Group E

Fourth round

The fourth round saw the group winners and runners-up from the third round play in two groups of five. The top two teams from each group advanced to the 2014 FIFA World Cup in Brazil, while the two third-placed teams advance to the fifth round. Japan, South Korea, Australia and Iran have qualified for the 2014 FIFA World Cup.

Seeding
The draw for Round Four was held on 9 March 2012 in Kuala Lumpur, Malaysia, with the teams seeded according to their March 2012 FIFA Ranking. The FIFA rankings used were released on 7 March 2012 and included all matches from the third round of Asian qualifiers for the 2014 FIFA World Cup. The ten teams (shown below with their March 2012 FIFA Ranking in brackets) are split into five pots, with each group containing a team from each pot.

Groups
The matches were played from 3 June 2012 to 18 June 2013.

As the competition partially overlapped with the 2013 FIFA Confederations Cup, which was held from 15 June 2013, the AFC decided that the match day will be adjusted for Japan, the representative of AFC for the Confederations Cup, placing them on Position 5 in their group in order not to play on 18 June 2013.

Group A

Group B

Fifth round

The two teams who finished third in the fourth round groups (Jordan and Uzbekistan) played each other to determine the AFC participant in the intercontinental play-off.

The draw for the fifth round of the AFC qualifiers was held in Zürich on 19 March 2013 during meetings of the Organising Committee for the FIFA World Cup. The games took place on 6 and 10 September 2013. With the two teams still evenly matched at full-time in the second leg, Jordan eventually progressed to the intercontinental playoff after winning 9–8 on penalties.

|}

Inter-confederation play-offs

The fifth round winner, Jordan, played against CONMEBOL's fifth-placed team, Uruguay, in a home-and-away play-off. The winner of this play-off, Uruguay, qualified for the 2014 FIFA World Cup finals.

The first leg was played on 13 November 2013, and the second leg was played on 20 November 2013.

Qualified teams
The following four teams from AFC qualified for the final tournament.

1 Bold indicates champions for that year. Italic indicates hosts for that year.

Goalscorers
There were 432 goals scored in 150 games (including inter-confederation play-offs), for an average of 2.88 goals per game.

8 goals

 Shinji Okazaki

7 goals

 Younis Mahmoud
 Hassan Abdel-Fattah
 Ahmad Hayel
 Lê Công Vinh

6 goals

 Javad Nekounam
 Park Chu-young

5 goals

 Joshua Kennedy
 Hao Junmin
 Keisuke Honda
 Amer Deeb
 Hassan Maatouk
 Khalfan Ibrahim
 Nasser Al-Shamrani
 Lee Keun-ho

4 goals

 Ismail Abdul-Latif
 Sayed Saeed
 Yang Xu
 Cristian Gonzáles
 Nashat Akram
 Shinji Kagawa
 Ryoichi Maeda
 Yousef Nasser
 Bahodir Nasimov
 Server Djeparov

3 goals

 Alex Brosque
 Brett Holman
 Tim Cahill
 Karim Ansarifard
 Mojtaba Jabbari
 Mohammad Reza Khalatbari
 Reza Ghoochannejhad
 Alaa Abdul-Zahra
 Abdallah Deeb
 Visay Phaphouvanin
 Ali Al Saadi
 Mahmoud El Ali
 Safee Sali
 Amad Al-Hosni
 Ahmed Mubarak Al-Mahaijri
 Murad Alyan
 Yusef Ahmed
 Sebastián Soria
 Aleksandar Đurić
 Raja Rafe
 Ismail Matar
 Ulugbek Bakayev
 Alexander Geynrikh
 Sanzhar Tursunov

2 goals

 Archie Thompson
 Luke Wilkshire
 Mohammed Tayeb Al Alawi
 Mahmood Abdulrahman
 Jahid Hasan Ameli
 Sam El Nasa
 Kouch Sokumpheak
 Chen Tao
 Deng Zhuoxiang
 Yu Hai
 Yu Hanchao
 Zheng Zheng
 Chen Po-liang
 Hadi Aghili
 Ashkan Dejagah
 Gholamreza Rezaei
 Andranik Teymourian
 Hawar Mulla Mohammed
 Mike Havenaar
 Yuzo Kurihara
 Saeed Murjan
 Musaed Neda
 Manolom Phomsouvanh
 Lamnao Singto
 Roda Antar
 Aidil Zafuan
 Mohd Safiq Rahim
 Anil Gurung
 Ju Manu Rai
 Abdulaziz Al-Muqbali
 Ismail Al-Ajmi
 Pak Nam-chol
 Phil Younghusband
 Mohammed Kasola
 Mohammed Razak
 Mohammed Noor
 Shi Jiayi
 Ji Dong-won
 Kim Bo-kyung
 Koo Ja-cheol
 Lee Dong-gook
 Teerasil Dangda
 Datsakorn Thonglao
 Ismail Al Hammadi
 Mohamed Al-Shehhi
 Ali Al-Wehaibi
 Bashir Saeed
 Odil Ahmedov
 Huỳnh Quang Thanh
 Nguyễn Quang Hải

1 goal

 Balal Arezou
 Brett Emerton
 Lucas Neill
 Mile Jedinak
 Harry Kewell
 Tommy Oar
 Mark Bresciano
 Robbie Kruse
 Mahmood Al-Ajmi
 Mithun Chowdhury
 Mohamed Zahid Hossain
 Rezaul Karim
 Chhin Chhoeun
 Khuon Laboravy
 Li Weifeng
 Qu Bo
 Yu Dabao
 Zheng Zhi
 Chang Han
 Xavier Chen
 Jeje Lalpekhlua
 Gouramangi Singh
 Muhammad Ilham
 Mohammad Nasuha
 Bambang Pamungkas
 Muhammad Ridwan
 Saeid Daghighi
 Jalal Hosseini
 Ali Karimi
 Milad Meydavoudi
 Hammadi Ahmad
 Karrar Jassim
 Mustafa Karim
 Qusay Munir
 Hiroshi Kiyotake
 Yuichi Komano
 Yasuyuki Konno
 Kengo Nakamura
 Maya Yoshida
 Baha' Abdel-Rahman
 Khalil Bani Attiah
 Bashar Bani Yaseen
 Mussab Al-Laham
 Tha'er Bawab
 Basem Fathi
 Waleed Ali
 Fahad Al Ansari
 Fahad Al Enezi
 Bader Al-Mutawa
 Hussain Fadel
 Khampheng Sayavutthi
 Souliya Syphasay
 Kanlaya Sysomvang
 Soukaphone Vongchiengkham
 Tarek El Ali
 Abbas Atwi
 Mohammed Ghaddar
 Akram Moghrabi
 Leong Ka Hang
 Abdul Hadi Yahya
 Khürelbaataryn Tsend-Ayuush
 Mai Aih Naing
 Pai Soe
 Bharat Khawas
 Jagajeet Shrestha
 Sujal Shrestha
 Bhola Silwal
 Jang Song-hyok
 Mohammed Al-Balushi
 Hussain Al-Hadhri
 Juma Darwish Al-Mashri
 Ismail Al-Amour
 Houssam Wadi
 Nate Burkey
 Emelio Caligdong
 Ángel Guirado
 Stephan Schröck
 Abdulaziz Al Sulaiti
 Mohamed El-Sayed
 Meshal Mubarak
 Abdulgadir Ilyas Bakur
 Salem Al-Dossari
 Ahmed Al-Fraidi
 Osama Al-Muwallad
 Mohammad Al-Sahlawi
 Hassan Fallatah
 Osama Hawsawi
 Naif Hazazi
 Mohammad Abdul
 Fahrudin Mustafić
 Qiu Li
 Chathura Gunaratne
 Kim Jung-woo
 Kim Shin-wook
 Kwak Tae-hwi
 Son Heung-min
 Kim Chi-woo
 George Mourad
 Nadim Sabagh
 Akhtam Khamroqulov
 Kamil Saidov
 Jakkraphan Kaewprom
 Sompong Soleb
 João Kik
 Arslanmyrat Amanow
 Gahrymanberdi Çoňkaýew
 Wýaçeslaw Krendelew
 Berdi Şamyradow
 Hamdan Al-Kamali
 Ahmed Khalil
 Mahmoud Khamees
 Anzur Ismailov
 Marat Bikmaev
 Jasur Hasanov'''
 Timur Kapadze
 Victor Karpenko
 Aleksandr Shadrin
 Maksim Shatskikh
 Oleg Zoteev
 Nguyễn Ngọc Thanh
 Nguyễn Trọng Hoàng
 Nguyễn Văn Quyết
 Phạm Thành Lương

1 own goal

 Mile Jedinak (playing against Oman)
 Mahmoud Baquir Younes (playing against Kuwait)
 Rashid Al-Farsi (playing against Thailand)
 Ki Sung-yueng (playing against Uzbekistan)
 Farrukh Choriev (playing against Syria)
 Walid Abbas (playing against Kuwait)
 Hamdan Al-Kamali (playing against South Korea)
 Artyom Filiposyan (playing against South Korea)
 Akmal Shorakhmedov (playing against South Korea)

References

External links
Results and schedule (FIFA.com version)
Results and schedule (the-AFC.com version)
 World Cup Qualification Asia – Hailoosport.com (Arabic)
 World Cup Qualification Asia – Hailoosport.com

 
Afc
FIFA World Cup qualification (AFC)
2011 in Asian football